Yembe-Moke Airport  was an airstrip serving Bikoro, a town at the western coast of Lake Tumba in Équateur Province, Democratic Republic of the Congo. As of 2022, the area around former runway is part of newly created farmland.

There are currently no scheduled airline services operating from Yembe-Moke.

See also 

 
 
 Transport in the Democratic Republic of the Congo
 List of airports in the Democratic Republic of the Congo

References

External links 

 OpenStreetMap - Yembe-Moke Airport

Airports in the Province of Équateur